779 Naval Air Squadron (779 NAS) was a Naval Air Squadron of the Royal Navy's Fleet Air Arm.

References

Citations

Bibliography

The 779 Fleet Requirement unit was formed as the Gibraltar fleet requirement unit on 1 October 1941 with just two Skuas for target towing and coastal defence, later acquiring a small number of Swordfish as well as Defiants, Fulmars and Sea Hurricanes. Variety of aircraft later included Beaufighters IIs, while detachments saw service in Italy and North Africa, but two Swordfish remained in the squadron to the end of the war.

700 series Fleet Air Arm squadrons
Military units and formations established in 1941
Military units and formations of the Royal Navy in World War II